Falihi (also Romanized as Falīḩī and Feleyhī; also known as Falḩī) is a village in Mollasani Rural District, in the Central District of Bavi County, Khuzestan Province, Iran. At the 2006 census, its population was 170, in 36 families.

References 

Populated places in Bavi County